Hockey in Germany may refer to:

Field hockey
 German Hockey Federation
 Men's Feldhockey Bundesliga
 Women's Feldhockey Bundesliga

Ice hockey
 Ice hockey in Germany
 German Ice Hockey Federation
 Deutsche Eishockey Liga